Blake Schilb (born December 23, 1983) is an American-born naturalized Czech former professional basketball player who last played for USK Praha of the Czech NBL. Standing , he plays the point forward position.

College career
Prior to Loyola University, Schilb was a postgraduate student at Brewster Academy in Wolfeboro, New Hampshire, during the 2002-2003 academic year.

A 6'7" (201 cm) guard (during his college days), Schilb played at Loyola University Chicago, with the Loyola Ramblers, from 2003 to 2007. In 2006, he became Loyola's first player since Alfredrick Hughes in 1985 to earn Associated Press All-American honors after averaging 19.1 points, 5.2 rebounds and 3.9 assists per game. He graduated from Loyola as the school's fourth all-time leading scorer (1,879 points) and all-time leader in three-point field goals (204).

After his junior season, Schilb became an early entry candidate for the 2006 NBA draft, but he withdrew his name before the deadline so he could return for his senior year. Schilb went undrafted by any NBA teams after his senior year.

Professional career

Schilb signed with the French league team Élan Chalon in 2009. In his third season with the team, he was named LNB Pro A 2011–12 season French League Foreign Player MVP. In the final, he helped his team win the title with 20 points, 10 assists and 5 rebounds, earning the Final MVP award.

On August 2, 2012, Schilb extended his contract with Élan Chalon for one more season. In January 2013, Galatasaray offered 300,000 euros for a buyout of his contract and a salary that was three times larger than his current one, but Schlib turned down the offer. In his first EuroLeague season, he averaged 15.5 points, 4.6 rebounds and 4 assists over 10 games.

On June 23, 2013, he signed a three-year contract with the Serbian team Crvena zvezda. On January 29, 2014, he officially parted ways with Crvena zvezda. The next day, he returned to France and signed with Paris-Levallois. On April 15, 2015, he parted ways with Paris.

On July 23, 2015, Schilb signed a one-year deal with the Turkish club Galatasaray. On July 28, 2016, he re-signed with Galatasaray for one more season.

On September 30, 2017, Schilb signed with Spanish club Real Betis Energía Plus.

Career statistics

EuroLeague

|-
| style="text-align:left;"| 2012–13
| style="text-align:left;"| Élan Chalon
| 10 || 10 || 32.5 || .449 || .341 || .850 || 4.6 || 4.0 || 1.3 || .3 || 15.5 || 17.6
|-
| style="text-align:left;"| 2013–14
| style="text-align:left;"| Crvena zvezda
| 10 || 10 || 28.6 || .495 || .379 || .773 || 3.2 || 3.5 || .7 || .2 || 12.0 || 11.9
|-
| style="text-align:left;"| 2016–17
| style="text-align:left;"| Galatasaray
| 27 || 19 || 25.6 || .497 || .310 || .870 || 3.9 || 4.0 || .7 || .1 || 9.3 || 12.0
|- class="sortbottom"
| style="text-align:center;" colspan=2 | Career
| 47 || 39 || 27.7 || .483 || .333 || .835 || 3.9 || 3.9 || .8 || .2 || 11.2 || 13.2

International career
On August 20, 2015, Schilb obtained Czech Republic citizenship and became a naturalized player for the Czech Republic national basketball team. He represented the Czech Republic at the 2019 FIBA Basketball World Cup and the 2020 Summer Olympics.

References

External links

 Blake Schilb at acb.com 
 Blake Schilb at euroleague.net
 Blake Schilb at fiba.com
 Blake Schilb at lnb.fr 
 Blake Schilb at tblstat.net
 

1983 births
Living people
2019 FIBA Basketball World Cup players
ABA League players
American expatriate basketball people in the Czech Republic
American expatriate basketball people in France
American expatriate basketball people in Serbia
American expatriate basketball people in Spain
American expatriate basketball people in Turkey
American men's basketball players
Basketball Nymburk players
Basketball players at the 2020 Summer Olympics
Basketball players from Illinois
Brewster Academy alumni
Champagne Châlons-Reims Basket players
Czech expatriate basketball people in France
Czech expatriate basketball people in Serbia
Czech expatriate basketball people in Spain
Czech expatriate basketball people in Turkey
Czech men's basketball players
Élan Chalon players
Galatasaray S.K. (men's basketball) players
KK Crvena zvezda players
Liga ACB players
Loyola Ramblers men's basketball players
Metropolitans 92 players
Olympic basketball players of the Czech Republic
People from Rantoul, Illinois
Power forwards (basketball)
Real Betis Baloncesto players
Small forwards